The 2016 Taça de Portugal Final was the last match of the 2015–16 Taça de Portugal, which decided the winner of the 76th season of the Taça de Portugal. It was played on 22 May 2016 at the Estádio Nacional in Oeiras, between Porto and Braga. 

Braga beat Porto 4–2 in a penalty shoot-out, after a 2–2 draw persisted through extra time, and won their second title in the competition, 50 years after their maiden triumph in the 1965–66 season.

As the winners, Braga earned the right to play the 2016 Supertaça Cândido de Oliveira against 2015–16 Primeira Liga winners Benfica, and also qualified for the 2016–17 UEFA Europa League group stage. However, as their league placing (fourth) also secured entry to this competition via the third qualifying round, this berth was transferred to the sixth-placed team (Rio Ave).

Route to the final
Note: In the table, the score of the finalist is given first (H = home; A = away).

Match

Details

Statistics

Broadcasting
The final was broadcast in Portugal on television by TVI and by SportTV (on SportTV 1), which holds the broadcasting rights for the whole competition.

References

2016
2015–16 in Portuguese football
FC Porto matches
S.C. Braga matches
Taça de Portugal Final 2016